The Men's 10 metre air rifle standing SH1 event at the 2016 Summer Paralympics took place on 8 September at the Olympic Shooting Centre in Rio.

The event consisted of two rounds: a qualifier and a final. In the qualifier, each shooter fired 40 shots with an air rifle at 10 metres distance from the "standing" (interpreted to include seated in wheelchairs) position. Scores for each shot were in increments of 1, with a maximum score of 10.

The top 8 shooters in the qualifying round moved on to the final round. There, they fired an additional 10 shots. These shots scored in increments of .1, with a maximum score of 10.9. The total score from all 50 shots were used to determine the final ranking.

Qualification round

Q – Qualified for final

Final

References

Men's 10 metre air rifle standing SH1